Arseny Yudilyevich Naydyonov (August 12, 1941 – June 7, 2010), commonly known as Arsen Naydyonov, was a Russian professional football coach. He was born as Arseny Rozman and took his wife's last name after the wedding, deciding his original Jewish last name would not help him in his career.

As a head coach of FC Zhemchuzhina Sochi he won zonal tournament of the Soviet Second League B (1991) and zonal tournament of the Russian First League (1992), than spent five seasons (1993–97) in the Russian Top League.

References

External links
 Career summary by KLISF
 

1941 births
2010 deaths
Sportspeople from Almaty
Soviet footballers
Soviet football managers
Russian football managers
Russian Jews
Soviet Jews
FC Chernomorets Novorossiysk managers
FK Köpetdag Aşgabat managers
FC Zhemchuzhina Sochi managers
FC SKA Rostov-on-Don managers
Russian Premier League managers
Association football forwards